Profundiconus hennigi is an extinct species of sea snail, a marine gastropod mollusc in the family Conidae, the cone snails and their allies.

Description
The size of the shell varies between 17.6 mm and 25.5 mm.

Distribution
This fossil coral reef-associated species was found in the Neogene of the Dominican Republic

References

 Hendricks J.R. (2015). Glowing seashells: diversity of fossilized coloration patterns on coral reef-associated cone snail (Gastropoda: Conidae) shells from the Neogene of the Dominican Republic. PLOS One. 10(4): e0120924

External links

hennigi
Gastropods described in 2015
Fossil taxa described in 2015